In Celebration is a 1975 British drama film directed by Lindsay Anderson. It is based in the 1969 stage production of the same name by David Storey which was also directed by Anderson. The movie was produced and released as part of the American Film Theatre, which adapted theatrical works for a subscription-driven cinema series. It was meant to be shown theatrically with tickets sold in advance.

Synopsis 
The film takes place in the Derbyshire mining town of Langwith. The Shaws' three sons have returned home to celebrate their 40th wedding anniversary. Mr. Shaw has been a coal miner for 49 years, and has only one year left until retirement. Mrs Shaw is the daughter of a pig breeder, meaning she came from a higher social class.

The parents urged their sons to abandon their father's trade in pursuit of professional careers, but the results have not been entirely positive. Andrew, the eldest, became a solicitor but has abandoned it to pursue painting. Colin, who was a Communist party member for a year, is now a prosperous but unfulfilled industrial relations manager for a car manufacturer, dealing with negotiations with the unions. The youngest brother, Steven, is a teacher, married with four children, and has abandoned a book he had been writing for several years.

The family go to an expensive restaurant, although the action is almost entirely in the couple's living room. A friendly neighbour is present for some of the scenes.

The film examines the tensions which develop over the course of one evening as the family reunite. The family recall unpleasant incidents, including a premarital pregnancy, physical abuse, child neglect, the death of the couple's first son, the mother's suicide attempt and the outing of another son.

Cast
In order of appearance:
 Steven Shaw: Brian Cox
 Mrs Burnett: Gabrielle Daye
 Mr. Shaw: Bill Owen
 Colin Shaw: James Bolam
 Andrew Shaw : Alan Bates
 Mrs. Shaw: Constance Chapman

Reception 
In Celebration received favourable reviews during its theatrical run.  Vincent Canby, writing in The New York Times, praised Anderson for having "succeeded in making a very complete, full-bodied film of Mr. Storey's play without being tricky or intrusive…Mr. Anderson has also gotten terrific performances from everyone, especially Mr. Bates, Miss Chapman and Mr. Cox, as the most troubled of the Shaw sons." New York Magazine echoed the sentiment, noting "Anderson and a superb cast have made a harrowing and satisfying suspense drama."

References

External links 
 
 

1975 films
1975 drama films
1975 LGBT-related films
1970s English-language films
1970s British films
British drama films
Films directed by Lindsay Anderson
Films produced by Ely Landau
Films scored by Christopher Gunning
Films shot at EMI-Elstree Studios
Films set in Derbyshire